The Wallowa River is a tributary of the Grande Ronde River, approximately  long, in northeastern Oregon in the United States. It drains a valley on the Columbia Plateau in the northeast corner of the state north of Wallowa Mountains.

The Wallowa Valley was home to Chief Joseph's band of the Nez Perce Tribe. Chief Joseph asked the first white settlers to leave when they arrived in 1871. The U.S. government expelled the tribe and seized their property and livestock in 1877, when non-Indian farmers and ranchers wanted to settle the fertile Wallowa valley.  The tribe was barred from returning to their homeland by the government after repeated petitions.  The tribal members were shipped in unheated box cars to Indian Territory (now Oklahoma) to be placed in a prisoner-of-war camp never to see their home again.

Course
The river begins at the confluence of its east and west forks, which rise in southern Wallowa County, in the Eagle Cap Wilderness of the Wallowa–Whitman National Forest. It flows generally northwest through the Wallowa Valley, parallel to the McCully Basin which is East of the ridge formed from East Peak, Hidden Peak and Aneroid Mountain. At this point, the West Fork of the Wallowa River drainage basin is connected to the North Fork of the Imnaha River by the Polaris Pass drainage divide.

It then flows past the communities of Joseph, Enterprise, and Wallowa. Further upstream it receives the Minam River from the left at the hamlet of Minam.

Fish
The Wallowa River supports populations of steelhead, spring Chinook salmon, and mountain whitefish among other species. Sockeye salmon were extirpated from the Wallowa River when a small dam was constructed at the outlet of Wallowa Lake in the headwaters of the river.  The dam was constructed to raise the level of the lake to store water for irrigation.

See also
List of longest streams of Oregon
List of rivers of Oregon

References

External links
Grande Ronde Model Watershed
National Wild and Scenic Rivers System

Rivers of Oregon
Nez Perce War
Wild and Scenic Rivers of the United States
Rivers of Wallowa County, Oregon